The Bureau of the Chamber of Deputies of Brazil is the body responsible for the direction of the legislative and administrative services of the Chamber of Deputies of Brazil.

Assignments

The Bureau:

     directing all the services of the House during the legislative session and their intervening;
     switch with the Bureau of the Federal Senate of Brazil's position Mesa National Congress;
     enact, together with the Bureau of the Senate amendments to the Federal Constiuição;
     propose action of unconstitutionality before the Supreme Court;
     advising on the drafting of the bylaws of the Board and changes;
     give their members assignments within 30 sessions after their composition;
     establish guidelines for the disclosure of the activities of the Chamber;
     adopt measures to protect the image of the House of Representatives;
     judicially or extrajudicially defend the constitutional prerogatives of Representatives;
     set at the beginning of the first and third legislative session of the legislature, heard the College Leaders of the Chamber of Deputies of Brazil, the number of Deputies or by Political Party Parliamentary Bloc in each Standing Committee;
     prepare, heard the college of leaders and the chairmen of standing committees, draft Rules Committee;
     comply with court decisions;

- Enjoy and send written requests for information to Ministers of State;

- Declare the disqualification of Mr;

- Apply the penalty of censure written Representatives;

- Decide, upon appeal, matters relating to the legal staff of the Board;

- Privately proposed project providing for the organization, operation, police, legal, creation and transformation and extinction of offices, positions and functions, besides the fixing of their remuneration;

- Provide the offices, positions and functions;

- Grant leave, retirement and benefits, as well as putting the servers on availability;

- Request servers direct public administration, public administration or indirect foundations;

- Approve the draft budget and forward it to the Executive;

- Forward to the Executive request additional credit necessary to the functioning of the Board;

- Establish limits of authority for the authorization of expenditure;

- Authorize the signing of agreements and contracts of service;

- Approve the budget of the analytical chamber;

- Authorize bids approve their results and approve the schedule of purchases;

- To exercise financial oversight over subsidized entities;

- Forward to the Court of Audit accountability of the Board;

- Requesting police backup.

Composition

Is composed of the Presidency, composed of a president and two vice presidents, and the Secretariat, which has four secretaries, and four alternates from Secretary. The jurisdiction of each of its members shall be defined in that Act must be published within 30 sessions after the composition of the Board, and shall have the powers of the legislative session earlier while not published such an act.

The Bureau shall meet ordinarily so biweekly, and extraordinarily, whenever called by the President or by four permanent members.

Chairman of the Board

Secretary of the Board

The Secretaries of the Board are called First, Second, Third Secretary, according to the descending order of votes obtained. Similarly the four alternates are called Secretaries.

In addition to overseeing the administrative, compete them, receive invitations, representations, petitions and memorials, make and receive correspondence, to decide in the first instance appeal against an act of the General Director of the Chamber, to interpret the legal staff of the House and give possession to Director-General of the Board, and the Secretary-General of the Bureau.

Legislative branch of Brazil
Presiding bodies of legislatures